John Wallace Jones (March 31, 1822 – September 6, 1895) was an American judge.

Born in Moulton, Lawrence County, Alabama, Jones became a district judge in Caddo Parish and also served as the mayor of Shreveport from 1854 to 1858. In addition to his civic career, Jones also served with distinction during the American Civil War as the Commanding Officer of Company K of the 19th Louisiana Infantry Regiment.  He died in Shreveport, Louisiana at the age of 73.

External links
John Wallace Jones entry at The Political Graveyard

Obituary of Judge John Jones at Newspaper.

1822 births
1895 deaths
Confederate States Army officers
Louisiana Democrats
Mayors of Shreveport, Louisiana
People from Moulton, Alabama
People of Alabama in the American Civil War
19th-century American politicians
Louisiana state court judges
19th-century American judges